The Bullwinkle and Rocky Role-Playing Party Game is a role-playing game published by TSR in 1988. It is based on characters and settings from The Rocky and Bullwinkle Show.

Description
The Bullwinkle and Rocky Role-Playing Party Game is a humor system based on the cartoon show, featuring Bullwinkle, Rocky, Boris Badenov, Natasha, Dudley Do-Right, Mr. Peabody and Sherman, etc. "How to Play the Game" (16 pages) starts with simple group storytelling, using story cards and predesigned plots, and gradually adds role-playing and character abilities. Action resolution is decided by spinners rather than dice. "Stories (16 pages) provides a number of plots based on the cartoons", while "The Guide to Frostbite Falls and Beyond" (32 pages) describes the world of Rocky and Bullwinkle, the use of the story cards, and characters' special powers. The game includes 10 character hand puppets.

Publication history
The Bullwinkle and Rocky Role-Playing Party Game was designed by David Cook and Warren Spector, and published by TSR in 1988 as a boxed set with a 32-page book, two 16-page books, 108 cards (two decks), 20 cardboard stand-ups (19 characters & 1 blank), six spinners, two cardstock sheets, 4 dice (2 moose dice & 2 flying squirrel dice) and 10 hand puppets.

Reception
Lawrence Schick comments that "The introductory-level rules are so loose, the game barely qualifies as an RPG." He commented that the hand puppets "have no bearing on play, but are nice to have".

The game was a Gamers' Choice award-winner.

Reviews
Dragon (Issue 144 - Apr 1989)
Isaac Asimov's Science Fiction Magazine v13 n1 (1989 01)

References

Comedy role-playing games
Role-playing games based on television series
Role-playing games introduced in 1988
The Adventures of Rocky and Bullwinkle and Friends
TSR, Inc. games